Grigory Fedotov Club is a non-official list of Soviet and Russian football players that have scored 100 or more goals during their professional career. This club is named after first Soviet player to score 100 goals - Grigory Fedotov. The list was created by journalist and statistician Konstantin Yesenin and Football weekly magazine, though many other versions of this list exist.

Which goals are counted 

Yesenin counted goals scored in the following matches:

 Championship - goals scored in top leagues of Soviet and Russian football competitions.
 Cup - goals in Russian and Soviet Cup and Supercup scored in the stages where top league teams participate.
 European cups - goals scored in European Champion Clubs Cup, UEFA Champions League, UEFA Cup, Cup Winners Cup and Intertoto Cup for both home and foreign clubs. Today, the UEFA Europa League, successor to the UEFA Cup, is also included in the count.
 National team - goals scored for national and olympic teams in the official matches.
 Spartakiads - goals in Spartakiads of Soviet people (1956 and 1979).
 Foreign clubs - only goals scored in the top leagues of the following countries are counted:
 Group A: Italy, Spain, Germany, England, France, Brazil, Argentina
 Group B: Netherlands, Portugal, Turkey, Greece, Scotland, Belgium, Czech Republic, Sweden, Austria, Denmark, Uruguay, Chile, Colombia, Mexico.

Alternative versions of the list, also called "Grigory Fedotov club" by their authors, may use different rules.

Grigory Fedotov Club as of August 28, 2011 

Players still playing are shown in bold.

References 
  Grigory Fedotov club as of September 23, 2003 according to Sovetsky Sport
  Site on Soviet and Russian football
  Возрождается клуб бомбардиров - Grigory Fedotov club as of 1992 and post-soviet information

See also
Lev Yashin Club
Yevhen Rudakov club
Oleh Blokhin club
Serhiy Rebrov club
Timerlan Huseinov club

Footballers in Russia
Footballers in the Soviet Union
Lists of association football players
Soviet football trophies and awards
Association football player non-biographical articles